Roland Putsche (born 21 March 1991) is an Austrian professional footballer who plays as a central midfielder for ATUS Velden.

Club career

SK Austria Kärnten
Putsche began his professional career at SK Austria Kärnten in the Austrian Bundesliga at just 18 years old. He played in the 2009–10 season before moving to fellow Austrian side Wolfsberger AC.

Wolfsberger AC
Putsche started playing at Wolfsberger AC in the 2010–11 season - at the time they were in the Austrian Football First League. The following 2011–12 season he helped his team secure promotion to the Austrian Bundesliga. Thereafter he played with Wolfsberg in the Bundesliga for four more seasons. He was an integral part of the team, making 118 appearances and scoring 6 goals.

Cape Town City
On 20 July 2016, Putsche joined South African Premier Soccer League outfit, Cape Town City.
Putsche plays as an anchor midfielder for the Cape Town side. He netted his first goal for the club in a 4–1 Telkom Knockout semi-final victory over Free State Stars. Putsche went on to win the Telkom Knockout with Cape Town City in the 2016, his first season at the club.

Putsche departed the club on 9 June 2020, returning to Europe.

ATUS Velden
In May 2021 it was confirmed, that Putsche had returned to Austrian football, signing with ATUS Velden, where he would both act as a player and assistant coach.

References

External links
 

1991 births
Living people
Sportspeople from Klagenfurt
Footballers from Carinthia (state)
Austrian footballers
Austrian expatriate footballers
Association football midfielders
Austrian Football Bundesliga players
South African Premier Division players
SK Austria Kärnten players
Wolfsberger AC players
Cape Town City F.C. (2016) players
Austrian expatriate sportspeople in South Africa
Expatriate soccer players in South Africa